FHFS is a FTP and HTTP Web Server package, transparently based on HFS and FileZilla.  FHFS is built to act as an all-in-one user-based file hosting website, good for schools, businesses, etc. whose students/employees need to easily transport files.  FHFS is designed specifically for account-based storage, not easily compatible with other uses or using over-top of an original HFS setup.  Early development was started in January 2011, beta builds were tested in October 2011, version 1.0 was released on 11/3/2011.  FHFS was started to accelerate development on FileSplat.com, as well as showcase the capabilities of HFS macros.  FHFS 2.0 was released on 10/28/2012, exactly one year after the first beta of 1.0.  FHFS was loosely based on source code from www.filesplat.com at the time, and was created by the same developer.  Filesplat no longer uses FHFS.  FHFS is written in several different languages, including: HFS Macros, XML, XHTML, CSS, JavaScript, DOS, PHP, and C#. FHFS is recognized by the developer of HFS. FHFS 2.0.5 contains roughly 9500 somewhat-compressed lines or 412,000 characters of original code.

Features 

- These are all in addition to the standard features of HFS.

 FTP via FileZilla Server, with SSL
 Account creation system
 Individual private and shared sections for user files
 Users can set entire folders to be publicly accessible.
 Upload without an account
 Thumbnails generated for pictures uploaded
 Ability to stream MP3s, alone or in playlists
 Video streaming with silverlight (2.1.x)
 Folder size calculation and content counters
 User preferences, including changing colors
 Macro-based accounts with ability to sign out
 Outgoing SMTP Email Integration
 Page to contact administrators
 SSL via Stunnel (HTTP and SMTP)
 Customizable account size limits for admins
 Refined user interface
 On-demand file hash calculation (via OpenSSL)
 One-Click copy URL to clipboard
 Email files to others within your browser
 Customizable FTP/HTTP Ports for Admins
 Integrated Database System
 New macro-based functions and global variables
 Full, feature-rich admin interface
 Forgotten password recovery system
 Gallery mode for photos uploaded
 SSL-certificate generator
 Basic PHP Integration
 Secure password hashing/salting
 Centralized CSS for all pages
 Admin can choose where to store user files
 Automatic update notifications
 Embedded resources and base64 images
 Admin can set a server-wide color default

See also 

 HFS
 FileZilla
 SendEmail
 Stunnel
 OpenSSL
 PHP
 Comparison of file hosting services

References

External links 
 Official Website

Windows Internet software